Monsang (Monsang, Monshang; autonym: Si:rti) is an unclassified Sino-Tibetan (possibly Sino-Tibetan) language spoken in the Northeast of India. Scott DeLancey, et al. (2015) classifies Monsang as a "Northwest Naga" language.

Distribution
Monsang is spoken in Chandel subdivision, Chandel district, Manipur, in the 6 villages of Liwachangning, Changnhe, Liwa Khullen (Meeleen), Liwa Sarei, Japhou, and Monsang Pantha (Pentha Khuwpuw).

Phonology
Unlike the more conservative Kuki-Chin languages spoken to the south such as Mizo, Monsang has many innovative phonological and morphological features.

References

External links 

 Link to ELAR documentation on Monsang grammar

Southern Naga languages
Languages of Manipur